Adranodoros (or Andranodorus) was the son-in-law of the Greek Sicilian king Hiero II of Syracuse in the 3rd century BCE, being married to Hiero's daughter Demarata. He was one of fifteen guardians named by Hiero to counsel Hiero's fifteen-year-old grandson and successor, Hieronymus of Syracuse, after Hiero died. Adranodoros dismissed the guardians, saying that they were not needed, and became Hieronymos's chief counsellor. He encouraged Hieronymus to change the allegiance of Syracuse from Rome to Carthage, and connect himself with Hannibal.

Hieronymus was a notably debauched young king, compared by later historians to the Roman emperor Elagabalus. He was murdered by a band of conspirators, having ruled for only 13 months. After the assassination of Hieronymus by Deinomenes, Andranodoros seized upon the island and the citadel with the intention of usurping the royal power; but finding difficulties in the way, he judged it more prudent to surrender them to the Syracusans, and because of this was elected one of their generals. But the people of Syracuse became suspicious of him. A comedian named Ariston who was a friend of Andranodoros' reported that the general had confided in him that he and Themistus (son of Gelon) were still plotting to seize sovereign power for themselves, and massacre the other leaders of the city. The magistrates of the island ordered that Andranodoros be killed, and so he was set upon by soldiers and assassinated shortly afterwards, as he entered the senate building, in 214.

The people of the island rose up and demanded justice for the killing of Andranodoros, but his killers, among them the soldier Sopater, defended themselves by describing Andranodoros' tyrannical intentions, and claiming that the true debaucheries of Hieronymus were really perpetrated by Andranodoros. Furthermore, that Andranodoros and Themistus had been incited to this conspiracy by their power-hungry wives, Hiero's granddaughter and daughter. The wives, including another daughter of Hiero unrelated to this affair, were then killed to appease the fury of the people that Sopater had stirred up.

Notes

Other sources
 http://www.math.nyu.edu/~crorres/Archimedes/Family/FamilyIntro.html

|width=25% align=center|Preceded by:Hieronymus
|width=25% align=center|Tyrant of Syracuse214 BCE 
|width=25% align=center|Succeeded by:Hippocrates and Epicydes
|-

3rd-century BC people
214 BC deaths
Year of birth unknown